William Henry Davison, 1st Baron Broughshane, KBE, FSA, JP, DL (1872 – 19 January 1953) was a British peer and Conservative Member of Parliament (MP) for Kensington South for twenty-four years.

Biography
Davison was born in Broughshane, County Antrim, the son of Richard Davison and his wife Annie née Patrick. He was educated at Shrewsbury and graduated from Keble College, Oxford, in 1895 with a Bachelor of Arts. In 1895, he was admitted to the Inner Temple as a barrister and earned his Master of Arts from Keble three years later in 1898. That same year, he married Beatrice Mary Roberts, a daughter of Sir Owen Roberts (and future great-aunt of Anthony Armstrong-Jones) and they later had four children.

In 1913, he became Mayor of Kensington, where he was resident.  During the Great War he was solely responsible for raising, equipping, clothing, housing and selecting the officers for the 22nd 'Kensington battalion' of the Royal Fusiliers.  The new volunteer battalion was greeted with great enthusiasm, Davison enthusing their patriotism, encouraging his heroes to great efforts.  He was a popular figure in the Royal Borough.  In taking the rank of Major he went with them to train on the Sussex Downs.  In 1917 the GOC General Barker wrote "The 22nd never lost a trench or failed their comrades in the day of battle." For which effort he was knighted in the 1918 New Year Honours when he was selected for the seat of Kensington South and elected for the Coupon on 14 December 1918.

Davison was a very active Unionist member in regular attendance at debates.  Although an English backbencher he had spent time in Ireland taking its historical disadvantages very seriously.  In 1919 he supported the police application to the Coalition government for extra taxes, pay and pension arrangements in that troubled province. As well as the armed services, he promoted pensions for millions of servicemen and women after demobilisation.  He called on the government to give more transparent explanations as to the cost of its taxation demands, and early on was one of the MPs behind a deposit system towards responsible candidate selection at election time.  Davison commented widely on industrial matters while pointing out that he was neither a miner nor an owner, a truly impartial position, in his opinion: supporting "improved conditions" and a decent standard of living for miners, and a fair price for coal. Fairness extended also to bacon and butter for the Irish people in the midst of a war against Britain; and also towards the defeated Germans who should not in his opinion have lost so much in reparations.  Davison believed in free trade, commodification and price reduction of items like tobacco. In one speech he linked "high prices resulting in national unrest" to the need for increased industrial production.

Sir William did much for the conservation of the Royal Borough.  In parliament he spoke against demolition of listed buildings by the council. During the war he was a loyal friend to Churchill, defending the PM when the Conservatives were verbally attacked in the Commons by truculent Labour left-wingers. From the very outset Davison had pressed Chamberlain to take prompt action against the British Union of Fascists leader Sir Oswald Molsey. He stood up for the poor in war-torn London asking for workmen's dwellings to be exempt for the War Damage Contribution tax.  Observing in one debate that in his constituency there was a "notable lack of panic."

Family
He married Beatrice, daughter of Sir Owen Roberts of Henley Park and Plas Dinas in 1898.   They had two sons later to inherit the title, and two daughters.  In 1929, he divorced his wife and was remarried on 6 June to Louisa Mary Constance, daughter of Major Charles Marriott. The following year he joined the Conservative Party proper after two decades a Unionist.  Davison resigned his seat, was raised to the peerage as Baron Broughshane, of Kensington in the County of London, shortly after the general election, on 19 September 1945.  In the subsequent by-election the Conservative candidate held on to the constituency.  Lord Broughshane was a Freeman of the City of London and a wartime Master of the Clothworkers Company.  He died in 1953.

References

External links

 
 

1872 births
1953 deaths
People from Broughshane
Davison, William
Alumni of Keble College, Oxford
Fellows of the Society of Antiquaries of London
Knights Commander of the Order of the British Empire
Davison, William
People educated at Shrewsbury School
Conservative Party (UK) hereditary peers
Davison, William
Davison, William
Davison, William
Davison, William
Davison, William
Davison, William
Davison, William
Davison, William
UK MPs who were granted peerages
Davison, William
Deputy Lieutenants of the County of London
UK MPs 1945–1950
Barons created by George VI